"Baby It's You" is a song by American recording artist JoJo, featuring American rapper Bow Wow. Written by Harvey Mason, Jr., Damon Thomas, Eric Dawkins and Antonio Dixon, and produced by The Underdogs, the song was released in September 2004 as the second single from JoJo's self-titled debut album. It reached No.22 on the US Billboard Hot 100, peaked at No.8 on the UK Singles Chart, and entered the top 40 in nine additional countries.

Song information
The single version, which can be found on the UK and Japanese pressings of the JoJo album, features Bow Wow. In 2005, actress Alyson Stoner recorded a cover of "Baby It's You".

Music video
The video was directed by Erik White on location at Six Flags Magic Mountain and Hurricane Harbor. Most of the performance shots were filmed in front of the Center Ring gaming area and other shots feature the ProSlide Tornado, Scream and Colossus roller coasters. It premiered on MTV's TRL September 7, peaked as high as No.4 and lasted 23 days on the countdown, and also on BET's 106 & Park on September 21.

Track listings

UK CD1
 "Baby It's You" (featuring Bow Wow) – 3:36
 "Baby It's You" (Full Phat Street Mix) – 3:28

UK CD2 and Australian CD single
 "Baby It's You" (featuring Bow Wow) – 3:36
 "Baby It's You" (Full Phat Street Mix) – 3:28
 "Leave (Get Out)" (Copenhaniacs Remix) – 3:50
 "Leave (Get Out)" (Funky Angelz Remix) – 4:15
 "Baby It's You" (video featuring Bow Wow) – 3:39

European CD single
 "Baby It's You" (featuring Bow Wow) – 3:41
 "Baby It's You" – 3:15

German Pock It! CD single
 "Baby It's You" (featuring Bow Wow)
 "Leave (Get Out)" (album version)

Charts

Certifications

Release history

References

2004 singles
2004 songs
Bow Wow (rapper) songs
JoJo (singer) songs
Music videos directed by Erik White
Song recordings produced by the Underdogs (production team)
Songs written by Antonio Dixon (songwriter)
Songs written by Damon Thomas (record producer)
Songs written by Eric Dawkins
Songs written by Harvey Mason Jr.